The 44th TLC Support Battalion "Penne" is a telecommunications (TLC) support battalion of the Italian Army's signal corps. The battalion is based in Rome and assigned to the Army Logistic Command. The unit was formed in 1957 as a battalion, which operated and maintained the army's telecommunication network in the Abruzzo, Lazio, Marche, and Umbria regions. In 1976 the battalion was named for the Forca di Penne Pass and received its own flag. In 1993 the battalion entered the newly formed 44th Signal Regiment, which in 1998 was reorganized as a telecommunications support regiment tasked with building the army's telecommunications network in central Italy, southern Italy, and on the islands of Sardinia and Sicily, and providing third line maintenance for the network in the aforementioned regions. The regiment's previous task of operating and maintaining the army's telecommunication network in central Italy was transferred to the 3rd Signal Regiment. In 2017 the regiment was disbanded and the battalion became once more an autonomous unit.

History 
On 1 October 1957 the XLIV Signal Battalion was formed in Rome with the personnel and materiel of the existing 8th Territorial Signal Company and the Signal Company of the Territorial Military Command of Sardinia. The battalion consisted of a command, a command and services platoon, and three signals companies. The battalion was assigned to the VIII Territorial Military Command in Rome.

On 31 March 1962 the battalion's 3rd Signal Company, which was detached to Cagliari, became an autonomous unit. The next day the company was renamed Signal Company of the Sardinia Military Command and assigned to the Sardinia Military Command.

During the 1975 army reform the army disbanded the regimental level and newly independent battalions were granted for the first time their own flags. During the reform signal battalions were renamed for mountain passes. On 1 January 1976 the XLIV Signal Battalion was renamed to 44th Signal Battalion "Penne". The battalion consisted of a command, a command and services platoon, and two signal companies. The battalion was assigned to the Signal Command of the Central Military Region and operated and maintained the army's telecommunication network in the Abruzzo, Lazio, Marche (minus the provinces of Ancona and Pesaro), and Umbria regions. On 12 November 1976 the battalion was granted a flag by decree 846 of the President of the Italian Republic Giovanni Leone.

On 1 January 1988 the battalion consisted of a command, command and services company, and the 1st and 2nd TLC infrastructure managing companies, and the 3rd Field Support Company.

On 19 November 1993 the 44th Signal Battalion "Penne" lost its autonomy and the next day the battalion entered the newly formed 44th Signal Regiment as Battalion "Penne". On the same date the flag of the 44th Signal Battalion "Penne" was transferred from the battalion to the 44th Signal Regiment.

On 1 December 1998 the regiment was renamed 44th TLC Support Regiment. On 1 January 2017 the regiment was disbanded and the battalion became once more an autonomous unit and was renamed 44th TLC Support Battalion "Penne".

Current structure 
As of 2023 the 44th TLC Support Battalion "Penne" consists of:

  Battalion Command, in Rome
 Command and Logistic Support Company
 Maintenance Company
 Supply Company

The Command and Logistic Support Company fields the following platoons: C44 Platoon, Transport and Materiel Platoon, Medical Platoon, and Commissariat Platoon.

External links
Italian Army Website: 44° Battaglione Sostegno TLC "Penne"

References

Signal Regiments of Italy